Isabel Maria Cortesão Casimiro (born 14 January 1955) is a Mozambican sociologist, women's rights activist, and a former politician. She is a professor at the Centre of African Studies, Eduardo Mondlane University in Maputo, Mozambique. She is a feminist and women's rights activist, and founder of Fórum Mulher and Women and Law in Southern Africa Research and Education Trust. She was a FRELIMO Member of Parliament from 1995 to 1999.

Early life
Isabel Maria Casimiro was born on 14 January 1955 in Iapala, a small village in Nampula Province, on the north-east coast of Mozambique. Her father was a medical doctor based at the railway station in Iapala. Her parents had moved to Mozambique in 1952, because they were members of the Portuguese Communist Party, which had been declared illegal by the government, so they were effectively "exiled" to what was then one of Portugal's overseas colonies.

Career
From 1995 to 1999 Casimiro was a Member of Parliament, representing FRELIMO, the Mozambique Liberation Front.

Casimiro is the founder, and president from 2006 to 2015, of Fórum Mulher.

Casimiro is the founder and the first national coordinator of the Women and Law in Southern Africa Research and Education Trust (WLSA), based in Mozambique, and since 2015 she has been WLSA's Mozambique board president.

Casimiro is a sociology professor at the Centre of African Studies, Eduardo Mondlane University in Maputo, where she specialises in women's and human rights, feminist movements, development issues, and participatory democracy.

References

Living people
21st-century Mozambican women politicians
21st-century Mozambican politicians
Mozambican sociologists
Academic staff of the Eduardo Mondlane University
Women sociologists
FRELIMO politicians
People from Nampula Province
Mozambican feminists
1955 births
20th-century Mozambican women politicians
20th-century Mozambican politicians